Baharagora  Assembly constituency is an assembly constituency in the Indian state of Jharkhand.

Overview
According to the Delimitation of Parliamentary and Assembly Constituencies Order, 2008 of the Election Commission of India, Bahargora Assembly constituency covers Baharagora and Chakulia police stations. Baharagora (Vidhan Sabha constituency) is part of Jamshedpur (Lok Sabha constituency).

Members of Assembly 
 2005: Dinesh Kumar Sarangi, Bharatiya Janata Party
 2009: Bidyut Baran Mahato, Jharkhand Mukti Morcha
 2014: Kunal Sarangi, Jharkhand Mukti Morcha
 2019 Samir Mohanty, Jharkhand Mukti Morcha

Election Results

2019

See also
 Vidhan Sabha
 List of states of India by type of legislature

References
 
 Schedule – XIII of Constituencies Order, 2008 of Delimitation of Parliamentary and Assembly constituencies Order, 2008 of the Election Commission of India 

Assembly constituencies of Jharkhand